Aquila Basket Trento, also known for sponsorship reasons as Dolomiti Energia Trento, is an Italian professional basketball club based in Trent, Trentino.

It was founded in 1995 as an amalgamation of two local clubs, going from the amateur divisions to the first division LBA in less than a decade. It plays in the LBA as of the 2017–18 season.

History

Aquila Basket Trento was founded in 1995 from the merger of two clubs playing the seventh tier Serie D, Dolomiti Sport B.C. Trento and Pallacanestro Villazzano, under the impetus of their respective presidents; Gianni Brusinelli and Marco Angelini.
In 2000, Giovanni Zobele became club president and the same season Aquila Basket was promoted to the Serie C2, later moving up to the Serie C1 in 2002.

Long serving coach Maurizio Buscaglia was nominated before the 2003–04 season, he would help the club win the C1 the next season to be promoted to the fourth Serie B2, adding the C1 Cup with a 77–68 win over Navarra Ferentino.
Staying there for four years, it lost the promotion playoffs on game 5 in 2005–06, with Buscaglia leaving the following season.
Trento won the 2007–08 regular season but could not obtain promotion to the Divisione Nazionale A until buying Lumezzane's sporting rights in 2009.

For the club's first season in the third division, Vincenzo Esposito – notable for his playing career - was chosen for the coaching job, leading the club to the ninth place. Buscaglia returned to Trento in 2010, guiding the side to eighth in the league, though that meant it had to play in the relegation playoffs as the league was contracting, with their subsequent loss condemning them to relegation. However, Trento -  having earlier confirmed Busacaglia - was granted a wildcard by the league to stay at that level.

On 18 January 2012, Luigi Longhi replaced Zobele as president. In the course of the same 2011–12 season, Trento earned a promotion to the LegaDue after beating  BLS Chieti on 27 May 2012 to win the semifinals series 3–1, they went on to win the league outright after toppling Ferentino in the final. Trento adapted quickly to the professional second division, lifting the LegaDue Cup – organised in the PalaTrento - by beating  Pistoia 84–76 in the final, also reaching the promotion playoffs that same season. In 2013–14 it went one better, finishing the regular season in first place before downing Agrigento (3–0) Torino (3–2) and finally Capo d'Orlando (3–0) to earn a historic promotion to the first division Serie A.

Their first season in the elite was an unanticipated success as the promotees, led by Serie A MVP Tony Mitchell (also league top scorer), finished fourth in the regular season whilst the organisation had two other awardees at the Lega Basket Awards, with  Buscaglia coach of the year and GM Salvatore Trainotti best executive (repeating the LegaDue awards they earned in 2014).

Qualifying for the title playoffs for their first season in the elite, Trento won the first game of the quarterfinal series against Dinamo Banco di Sardegna Sassari 81–70 for another record, but could not make their home advantage count as they then lost a closely contested game at the PalaTrento before being defeated in both away games to the eventual champions.
That result did ensure the side would participate in a European competition for the first time ever, earning a place in the second-tier EuroCup for 2015–16. The club reached the semi-finals in the competition.

In the 2016–17 season, Trento reached the Italian League Finals for the first time in club history after beating Olimpia Milano in the semi-finals series 4–1. In the 2017 LBA Finals, Trento lost to Reyer Venezia, 2–the 2017–18 season, Trento reached the Italian League Finals for the second time in club history after beating Reyer Venezia in the semi-finals series. In the 2018 LBA Finals, Trento lost to Olimpia Milano, 2–4.

Players

Current roster

Notable players

Season by season

Honours

Domestic competitions
Divisione Nazionale A Gold
Champions: 2014
LegaDue Cup
Winners: 2013
Divisione Nazionale A
Champions: 2012

Sponsorship names
Throughout the years, due to sponsorship deals, it has been also known as:
Sosi Trento: (1995–2005)
Bitumcalor Trento: (2005–2013)
Aquila Basket Trento: (2013–2014)
Dolomiti Energia Trento: (2014–present)

Notes

References

External links
Official website 
Eurobasket.com Team Page
Serie A Profile  Retrieved 6 August 2015

1995 establishments in Italy
Basketball teams established in 1995
Basketball teams in Italy
Trento